The Institute for Cancer Prevention (IFCP) in Valhalla, New York, formerly the American Health Foundation, was the only National Cancer Institute designated cancer center described as focusing solely on prevention.

It declared bankruptcy in 2004, three months after federal auditors determined that the institute had improperly sought grant money to cover unrelated expenses.

References 

Cancer organizations based in the United States
Medical and health organizations based in New York (state)
Defunct organizations based in New York (state)